Charles M. DeCamp was an American college football player.

Princeton
Decamp was a prominent end for the Princeton Tigers football team of Princeton University.

1885
He was captain of the 1885 team retroactively named national champion. One source lists DeCamp as the player of the year.

References

Year of birth missing
Year of death missing
19th-century players of American football
American football ends
Princeton Tigers football players